Eric Paul Baumer is an American criminologist and Professor of Sociology and Criminology at Penn State University, where he is also head of the Department of Sociology and Criminology. With Wayne Osgood and Rosemary Gartner, he is the co-editor of the Journal of Criminology, the official Journal of the American Society of Criminology (ASC). He was the vice president of the ASC from 2014 to 2015, and became an ASC fellow in 2016.

References

External links
Faculty page

Living people
American criminologists
Truman State University alumni
University of Missouri–St. Louis alumni
University at Albany, SUNY alumni
University of Missouri–St. Louis faculty
Florida State University faculty
Pennsylvania State University faculty
Academic journal editors
Year of birth missing (living people)